The Heavy Woollen District Independents is a political party based in the Heavy Woollen District of West Yorkshire, England. The party was registered with the Electoral Commission on 13 September 2017. Its leader is Aleksandar Lukic, who was the chairman for UKIP's Dewsbury, Batley and Spen branch until 2017.

Lukic was elected as councillor for the Dewsbury East ward of Kirklees Council in 2019 by 71 votes.

Paul Halloran stood for the party in the 2019 United Kingdom general election in Batley and Spen, coming third holding their deposit with 12.2% of the vote.

The party goes by a variety of descriptions, including:

 Dewsbury Borough Independents — Heavy Woollen District
 Batley Borough Independents — Heavy Woollen District
 Spen Valley Independents — Heavy Woollen District

A full list can be found at The Electoral Commission website.

References 

Locally based political parties in England
Political parties established in 2017
Heavy Woollen District